Ramón García de León y Pizarro (born Oran, now Algeria, 1745; died Charcas, Bolivia, December 1815), was a Spanish military officer and administrator. As president of the Real Audiencia of Charcas, he governed the Intendancy of Chuquisaca during the final colonial years of Upper Peru. He was also the founder of the city San Ramón de la Nueva Orán, in the north of present-day Argentina.

Origins and early career

Born to Jose Garcia de Leon and Francisca Rivera Pizarro Madrigal and Santamarina in the African city of Oran in the days when it was part of the Spanish Empire. He was descended from military family and nobles of Spain Large.  His nephew José García de León y Pizarro was president of Quito between 1778 and 1784 . As Marquis of House Pizarro and Viscount of the New Oran, a dynasty of continuous values and noble principles commensurate with their education, lineage and ancestry. In turn, related to the Duchy of Cadiz and Arcos County by his ancestor Rodrigo Ponce de León, noble of ancient lineage and the Duchy of Frías. One of the family genearcas Argentina today surnamed Garcia Yanez north of patrician descent, Salta and Santiago del Estero.

He joined the army, which made his career in the wars against the Muslims of North Africa. He made several maps of North African coasts.
He came to America in the year 1771 . Served in the garrison of Cartagena de Indias, and was governor of Riohacha. He later became governor of missions Maynas, after the expulsion of its founders, the Jesuits. He was also governor of the territory of Mompox, dedicated mainly to demarcate the border with Portugal in the area of the Marañón River.

In 1779 obtained the government of Guayaquil, in which he was appointed governor of Guayaquil, standing out for its efficient government, and the modernization of the fortifications of the port. He held Captaincy General in the Spanish colonies of Upper Peru and went so far in his military career in the Royal Navy Spanish, that of General of the Army.

Foundation of New Oran

In March 1789 he was appointed governor of the province of Salta, the second governor of that province, after its separation from Tucumán . He was sworn in Buenos Aires, after crossing the province without hold office. Back, made a long visit to the interior of the province, so we just took office in December 1791 .
Just arrived, paid a visit to the eastern border of the province, the most exposed to attacks by the Indians of Chaco, especially by wichí and the Guarani known by the Spanish as chiriguanos .

Excited about the possibilities that, in his view, Zenta Valley offered,- where there had been a mission established by the Franciscans - he decided to found a city particularly designed for defensive purposes. In late August 1795 he founded the city of San Ramon de la Nueva Oran (in a curious double tribute to himself, put his name and his hometown in the new city's name) - but the forest landscape of the New Oran not seems nothing like the desert coast of the old.

He brought 150 families, totaling 800 people, to found the city, along with nearly 45,000 head of livestock.  It was officially the last city founded in the current Argentina before Independence, and the only - of those that still existed in 1810 - that became the provincial capital.  In 1794, he moved the Cathedral of Salta to the temple that had been of the Jesuits. He was assigned the degree of Mariscal.

Municipality of Charcas

In October 1796 he was appointed governor of the Upper Peruvian province of Charcas, a post that included the presidency of the Court of that city. Took office in October the following year.

He began his government without much luster, especially since he had no experience. He had several clashes with the city council, with the audience, with the University and with Archbishop Moxó.  Amid the perpetual conflict between authorities that were standard in Cologne and given his advanced age, he left administrative matters in the hands of his colleagues, but his government was generally regarded as positive.

In 1806, upon the British Invasions, organized military forces to join the viceroy Rafael de Sobremonte, who came to fight.

18th-century Bolivian people
1745 births
1815 deaths